German submarine U-316 was a Type VIIC U-boat of Nazi Germany's Kriegsmarine during World War II. The submarine was laid down on 11 August 1942 at the Flender Werke yard at Lübeck as yard number 316, launched on 19 June 1943 and commissioned on 5 August under the command of Oberleutnant zur See Hermann Stuckmann.

The U-boat spent her career as a training vessel. She sank or damaged no ships.

She was scuttled on 2 May 1945 at war's end.

Design
German Type VIIC submarines were preceded by the shorter Type VIIB submarines. U-316 had a displacement of  when at the surface and  while submerged. She had two shafts and two  propellers.

U-316 was fitted with five  torpedo tubes (four fitted at the bow and one at the stern), fourteen torpedoes, one  SK C/35 naval gun, 220 rounds, and two twin  C/30 anti-aircraft guns. The boat had a complement of between forty-four and sixty.

Service history
The boat's service life began with training with the 22nd U-boat Flotilla from 5 August 1943. She was then transferred to the 23rd flotilla on 1 September. She was reassigned to the 31st flotilla on 20 February 1945.

Fate
The boat was scuttled near Travemünde (northeast of Lübeck) at war's end on 2 May 1945.

References

Bibliography

External links

German Type VIIC submarines
U-boats commissioned in 1943
World War II submarines of Germany
1943 ships
Ships built in Lübeck
Operation Regenbogen (U-boat)
Maritime incidents in May 1945